Luke Andrew Knapke (born January 10, 1997) is an American professional basketball player for Limburg United of the Pro Basketball League. He played college basketball for Toledo.

High school career
Knapke attended Marion Local High School. As a junior, he averaged 14.1 points and 7.5 rebounds per game to help his team finish 20–5. Knapke was named to the first-team all-league, second-team all-district and honorable-mention all-state. As a senior, he earned Special Mention All-District IV honors. In July 2014, he committed to Toledo, the first school to offer him a scholarship, over offers from Akron, Wright State, Miami (OH), Kent State, Ball State and Northern Kentucky.

College career
Knapke redshirted his true freshman season to put on weight and learn from star center Nathan Boothe. As a redshirt freshman, he averaged 6.9 points and 4.2 rebounds per game and earned MAC Distinguished Scholar-Athlete recognition. Knapke averaged 10.8 points and 6.3 rebounds per game as a sophomore, shooting 55.3 percent from the field. As a junior, he averaged 10.5 points and 6.6 rebounds per game. On December 4, 2019, Knapke recorded the third triple-double in school history with 12 points, 12 rebounds and a school-record 10 blocks in a win against Cleveland State. On December 8, he scored a career-high 33 points and grabbed 11 rebounds in a 82–72 win over Marshall. Knapke earned MAC West Division player of the week honors on December 10. Knapke averaged 15.8 points, 8.2 rebounds, 2.2 assists, and 1.9 blocks per game as a senior at Toledo, shooting 39.4 percent from three-point range. He was named to the Third Team All-MAC. He finished as Toledo's all-time leader in blocks with 197 and scored 1,451 points in his college career.

Professional career
On April 18, 2020, Knapke signed his first professional contract with Limburg United of the Pro Basketball League.

References

External links
Toledo Rockets bio

1997 births
Living people
American men's basketball players
American expatriate basketball people in Belgium
Basketball players from Ohio
Toledo Rockets men's basketball players
Limburg United players
People from Mercer County, Ohio
Centers (basketball)